Anil Mali is a Member of Legislative assembly from Deodar constituency in Gujarat for its 12th legislative assembly.

References

Living people
Bharatiya Janata Party politicians from Gujarat
Gujarat MLAs 2007–2012
Year of birth missing (living people)